The Wheel of Destiny is a 1927 American silent drama film directed by Duke Worne and starring Forrest Stanley, Georgia Hale and Percy Challenger.

Synopsis
After being rejected by a snobbish society woman, a young man falls and loses his memory. He ends up in an amusement park where he gets a job and is befriended by a woman working in a sideshow. Eventually he regains his memory and returns home, but chooses to marry his new friend.

Cast
 Forrest Stanley		
 Georgia Hale		
 Percy Challenger		
 Miss DuPont	
 Ernest Hilliard	
 Sammy Blum 
 Bynunsky Hyman 	
 Jack Herrick

References

Bibliography
 Munden, Kenneth White. The American Film Institute Catalog of Motion Pictures Produced in the United States, Part 1. University of California Press, 1997.

External links
 

1927 films
1927 drama films
1920s English-language films
American silent feature films
Silent American drama films
Films directed by Duke Worne
Rayart Pictures films
1920s American films